Kauklahti (Finnish) or Köklax (Swedish, alternative spelling Köklaks, old Finnish Kaukalaksi) is a district of Espoo, in the Greater Helsinki area of Finland. Kauklahti is growing fast and in 2006 hosted The Finnish Housing Fair.

See also 
 Districts of Espoo

External links 
 Map of Kauklahti

Districts of Espoo